The 2019 Women's County One-Day Championship was the 23rd cricket Women's County Championship season. It ran from late April to the beginning of June and saw 32 county teams and teams representing Scotland, Wales and the Netherlands compete in a series of divisions. Kent Women won the County Championship as winners of the top division with Yorkshire finishing runners-up. This is the record eighth Championship for Kent.

The tournament was followed by the 2019 Women's Twenty20 Cup and then by the 2019 Women's Cricket Super League, a professional tournament competed for by franchise teams.

Competition format 
Teams played matches within a series of divisions with the winners of the top division being crowned County Champions. Matches were played using a one day format with 50 overs per side.

The championship works on a points system with positions within the divisions being based on the total points. Points were awarded as follows:

Win: 10 points + bonus points. 
Tie: 5 points + bonus points. 
Loss: Bonus points.
Abandoned: 5 points.
Cancelled: Match not counted to average.
Conceded: -5 points for the side conceding, 18 points for their opponent.

Bonus points are collected for batting and bowling. The bonus points for each match are retained if the match is completed.

Batting

1.50 runs per over (RPO) or more: 1 point
2 RPO or more: 2 points
3 RPO or more: 3 points
4 RPO or more: 4 points

Bowling

3-4 wickets taken: 1 point
5-6 wickets taken: 2 points
7-8 wickets taken: 3 points
9-10 wickets taken: 4 points

Teams 
The 2019 Championship was divided into three divisions: Division One and Division Two with eight teams each, and Division Three with 19 teams divided into three groups of six or five teams. Teams in all divisions played each other once.

Division One 

As of 2 June 2019 — Source: ECB Women's County Championship

Division Two 

As of 14 July 2019 — Source: ECB Women's County Championship

Division Three

Group A 

As of 2 June 2019 — Source: ECB Women's County Championship

Group B 

As of 27 May 2019 — Source: ECB Women's County Championship

Group C 

As of 27 May 2019 — Source: ECB Women's County Championship

Statistics

Most runs

Source: CricketArchive

Most wickets

Source: CricketArchive

References

 
2019
2019 in Scottish cricket
2019 in Dutch cricket
cricket
cricket
cricket